Bayu Cinta Luna (Bayu Loves Luna) is an Indonesian TV series which aired on SCTV starring Bunga Citra Lestari and Chico Jericho

Cast
 Bunga Citra Lestari as Luna
 Chico Jericho as Bayu
 Ajeng Kartika as Zia
 Arie Dwi Andhika as Sandhy
 Bayu Kusuma Negara as Fahri
 Celine Evangelista as Nadia
 Rendy Septino as Krisna
 Eza Gionino as Ivan
 Siti Anizah as Riska
 Marsha Aruan as Tina
 Boy Tirayoh as Rahman
 Ria Probo as Lia
 Della Puspita as Seruni
 Tasman Taher as Imran
 Tyas Mirasih as Yulia
 Fendy Chow as Bimo
 Ade Surya Akbar as Dewo
 Donny Michael as Fariz

Synopsis
Rahman and Imran's friendship continues to their descendants. Rahman's sons, Bayu and Krishna are very close to Bimo, Imran's son. They also work in the same office.

Meanwhile, Luna has just quit her job over a trivial matter. Her boss misbehaved with her at a party which led to people thinking bad about her including Bayu who was also there at the party. Luna applies for a job at Bayu's office without his knowledge. Bimo, who has a liking for Luna, tells Bayu to look after that pretty girl. Bimo gets upset when Bayu accuses Luna of not being a nice girl.

As time goes by, Bimo finally dares to show his real feelings. But at the same time, Bayu comes to realize that Luna is actually a very pretty and a nice girl. Bayu too starts to fall in love with Luna. This confuses him as he doesn't know if he should choose his friendship with Bimo over his love for Luna. Indeed, two very difficult options but a decision has to be made.

Indonesian drama television series
2009 Indonesian television series debuts
2010 Indonesian television series endings
2000s Indonesian television series
2010s Indonesian television series
SCTV (TV network) original programming